Sonny Kahn is an American businessman. He is the co-founder and chairman of Crescent Heights, a real estate development company based in Miami Beach, Florida.

Kahn was raised in a Jewish family in Israel; in 1972, he emigrated to Los Angeles. He worked at various jobs including as a taxi driver and mechanic before getting into real estate development. In 1989, he co-founded the real estate development company, Crescent Heights with Russell W. Galbut and Bruce Menin which focused on converting apartments to condominiums. He is a billionaire. He is married to Suzanne Passi Kahn.

References

Living people
Israeli emigrants to the United States
Israeli Jews
People from Miami Beach, Florida
Businesspeople from Florida
American company founders
American Jews
American real estate businesspeople
American billionaires
American taxi drivers
Israeli taxi drivers
Year of birth missing (living people)